The 1922 Minneapolis Marines season was their second in the league. The team matched their previous output of 1–3, tying for thirteenth place in the league.

Schedule

Standings

References

Minneapolis Marines seasons
Minneapolis Marines
Marines